= Constituency W-319 =

Provincial constituency of Punjab, Pakistan

W-319
- Woman Reserved constituency for the Provincial Assembly of Punjab

Current constituency

Constituency W-319 is a reserved Constituency for women in the Provincial Assembly of Punjab.

== See also ==
- Punjab, Pakistan
